Cyrus Nils Tavares (April 12, 1902 – August 3, 1976) was a United States district judge of the United States District Court for the District of Hawaii.

Education and career

Born in Pukalani, Territory of Hawaii, Tavares received a Juris Doctor from University of Michigan Law School in 1925. He was in private practice of law in Maui County, Territory of Hawaii from 1925 to 1927. He was a deputy attorney general of the Territory of Hawaii from 1927 to 1934. He was in private practice in Honolulu, Territory of Hawaii from 1934 to 1941. He was a special deputy attorney general of the Territory of Hawaii for war matters from 1941 to 1942. He was an assistant attorney general of the Territory of Hawaii from 1942 to 1943. He was Attorney General of the Territory of Hawaii from 1944 to 1947. He was in private practice of law in Honolulu, Territory of Hawaii (State of Hawaii from 1959) from 1947 to 1960. From March 1953 to September 1956, Tavares served on the Hawaii Statehood Commission.

Federal judicial service

Tavares received a recess appointment from President Dwight D. Eisenhower on October 13, 1960, to the United States District Court for the District of Hawaii, to a new seat created by 73 Stat. 4. He was nominated to the same seat by President Eisenhower on January 10, 1961. He was confirmed by the United States Senate on September 21, 1961, and received his commission from President John F. Kennedy on September 22, 1961. He served as Chief Judge from 1960 to 1961. He assumed senior status on April 12, 1972. His service was terminated on August 3, 1976, due to his death.

References

Sources
 

1902 births
1976 deaths
Hawaii lawyers
Territory of Hawaii officials
Judges of the United States District Court for the District of Hawaii
United States district court judges appointed by Dwight D. Eisenhower
20th-century American judges
University of Michigan Law School alumni
20th-century American lawyers